is a Japanese former cyclist. He competed in the team pursuit event at the 1988 Summer Olympics. He later became a professional keirin cyclist with more than 200 wins.

References

External links
 

1966 births
Living people
Japanese male cyclists
Olympic cyclists of Japan
Cyclists at the 1988 Summer Olympics
Sportspeople from Fukushima Prefecture
Asian Games medalists in cycling
Asian Games gold medalists for Japan
Asian Games silver medalists for Japan
Cyclists at the 1986 Asian Games
Keirin cyclists
Medalists at the 1986 Asian Games